Sexual Morality is a 1965 book by Ronald Field Atkinson in which the author provides a critique of philosophical arguments about sex.

Reception
The book was reviewed by John C. Hall, K. W. Britton and D. Storey.

References

External links 
 Sexual Morality

1965 non-fiction books
Hutchinson (publisher) books
Sexual ethics books
Works about utilitarianism